Udita Duhan (born 14 January 1998) is an Indian field hockey player for the Indian national team.

She participated at the 2018 Women's Hockey World Cup.

References

External links

Udita at Hockey India

1998 births
Living people
Indian female field hockey players
Female field hockey midfielders
Field hockey players from Haryana
Sportswomen from Haryana
Field hockey players at the 2020 Summer Olympics
Olympic field hockey players of India
Field hockey players at the 2018 Asian Games
Asian Games silver medalists for India
Asian Games medalists in field hockey
Medalists at the 2018 Asian Games
Field hockey players at the 2022 Commonwealth Games
Commonwealth Games bronze medallists for India
Commonwealth Games medallists in field hockey
Medallists at the 2022 Commonwealth Games